Dabuya or Dabuyih, was the Dabuyid ruler (ispahbadh) of Tabaristan. He succeeded his father Gil Gavbara in 660 and reigned until his death in 712. His son, Farrukhan the Great succeeded him.

Sources 
 
 
 

7th-century births
712 deaths
8th-century rulers in Asia
7th-century rulers in Asia
8th-century Iranian people
7th-century Iranian people
Dabuyid dynasty